The 1918 Tulane Olive and Blue football team was an American football team that represented Tulane University as a member of the Southern Intercollegiate Athletic Association (SIAA) during the 1918 college football season. In its fourth year under head coach Clark Shaughnessy, Tulane compiled a 3–1–1 record.

Schedule

References

Tulane
Tulane Green Wave football seasons
Tulane Olive and Blue football